Brian Dabul and Sebastián Prieto were the defending champions but decided not to participate.
Franco Ferreiro and André Sá clinched their first title of this year (five titles in the 2010 season). They defeated Santiago González and Horacio Zeballos 7–5, 7–6(12) in the final.

Seeds

Draw

Draw

References
 Main Draw

Prime Cup Aberto de Sao Paulo - Doubles
2011 - Doubles
2011 in Brazilian tennis